The 2015 Cork Premier Intermediate Football Championship was the 10th staging of the Cork Premier Intermediate Football Championship since its establishment by the Cork County Board in 2006. The championship began on 1 May 2015 and ended on 18 October 2015.

On 18 October 2015, Carrigaline won the championship following a 0-12 to 0-11 defeat of St Michael's in the final at Páirc Uí Rinn. It was their first ever championship title.

Éire Óg's Daniel Goulding was the championship's top scorer with 1-34.

Team changes

To Championship

Promoted from the Cork Intermediate Football Championship
 Éire Óg

Relegated from the Cork Senior Football Championship
 St. Vincent's

From Championship

Promoted to the Cork Senior Football Championship
 Valley Rovers

Relegated to the Cork Intermediate Football Championship
 Glenville

Results

Round 1

Round 2

Round 3

Relegation playoff

Round 4

Quarter-finals

Semi-finals

Final

Championship statistics

Top scorers

Overall

In a single game

References

Cork Premier Intermediate Football Championship